Walter Henry Farquharson (born 30 May 1936) was Moderator of the United Church of Canada from 1990–1992. Born near Rosetown, Saskatchewan, he was educated at the University of Saskatchewan (BA, 1957) and St Andrew's College in the University of Saskatchewan (BD, 1961). After his ordination in 1960 he did a year of post-graduate study in Edinburgh, where he was also assistant minister at Morningside Parish Church. Returning to Canada he became the minister of the United Church in Saltcoats, Saskatchewan, where he remained until his retirement, and also, believing that ministry involves the whole of life, an English teacher in the local high school.

He is a noted hymn-writer; three of his hymns were published in The Hymn Book (Anglican and United Churches of Canada, 1971); one of his best-known, "Men go to God when they are sorely placed", a translation of Dietrich Bonhoeffer's Menschen gehen zu Gott in ihrer Not, also appeared in The Australian Hymn Book (Anglican, Methodist, Presbyterian, Congregational and Roman Catholic). Voices United, the United Church's successor hymnal to The Hymn Book (1971) contains thirteen Farquharson hymns. The Farquharson/Klusmeier collaboration "Walls That Divide" is sung at worship in churches throughout the world.

References
Wesley Milgate. Songs of the People of God: A Companion to The Australian Hymn Book. London: Collins, 1982.

www.musiklus.com/authors/ Profile of Walter Henry Farquharson on Ron Klusmeier website

1936 births
Living people
University of Saskatchewan alumni
Members of the United Church of Canada
People from Rosetown
Farquharson
People from Saltcoats, Saskatchewan
Ministers of the United Church of Canada
Canadian hymnwriters